Lee Tae-seok (born 28 July 2002) is a Korean footballer currently playing as a Left Winger, Wing-Back  for FC Seoul. He is the son of South Korean footballer, Lee Eul-yong.

Club career 
He joined FC Seoul in 2021

He made his league debut on 7 April 2021, against Ulsan Hyundai

International career 
He was part of the South Korea squad at the 2019 FIFA U-17 World Cup.

Career statistics

Club

References

External links
 

2002 births
Living people
South Korean footballers
South Korea youth international footballers
Association football forwards
K League 1 players
FC Seoul players